Meredosia is a village in Morgan County, Illinois, United States. The population was 1,044 at the 2010 census. It is part of the Jacksonville Micropolitan Statistical Area.

Geography

Meredosia is the home of the Meredosia National Wildlife Refuge.

Marais d'Osier, meaning willow swamp, was the original French name given to the area in the early 1800s.

Closing of Power Ameren Power Station 

In 2011, Ameren Energy Resources Company, LLC announced the closure of its power station in Meredosia. The closure resulted in a loss of over 50 jobs, a major economic hit for the small community. The plant closure was related to the cost of meeting environmental regulations. The plant may reopen at some point as a facility to test clean coal technology according to Ameren.

New bridge 
In June, 2018 the community celebrated the opening of a new bridge over the Illinois River. The former bridge, constructed in 1936, became too narrow for modern traffic, and was dismantled during the summer of 2018. The bridge not only links Meredosia to Quincy, Illinois, but serves as an important transportation link between Western Illinois and the center of the state.

Demographics

As of the census of 2000, there were 1,041 people, 450 households, and 301 families residing in the village. The racial makeup of the village was 99.90% White, and 0.10% from two or more races. Hispanic or Latino of any race were 0.10% of the population.

There were 450 households, out of which 28.2% had children under the age of 18 living with them, 55.1% were married couples living together, 8.7% had a female householder with no husband present, and 33.1% were non-families. 30.2% of all households were made up of individuals, and 16.7% had someone living alone who was 65 years of age or older. The average household size was 2.31 and the average family size was 2.85.

In the village, the population was spread out, with 24.0% under the age of 18, 6.4% from 18 to 24, 25.2% from 25 to 44, 25.2% from 45 to 64, and 19.2% who were 65 years of age or older. The median age was 41 years. For every 100 females, there were 97.5 males. For every 100 females age 18 and over, there were 95.3 males.

The median income for a household in the village was $32,961, and the median income for a family was $40,917. Males had a median income of $31,979 versus $16,842 for females. The per capita income for the village was $19,391. About 5.8% of families and 9.2% of the population were below the poverty line, including 11.6% of those under age 18 and 4.4% of those age 65 or over.

References

Villages in Morgan County, Illinois
Villages in Illinois
Jacksonville, Illinois micropolitan area